The 2021–22 USC Trojans women's basketball team represents the University of Southern California during the 2021–22 NCAA Division I women's basketball season. The Trojans play their home games at the Galen Center and are members of the Pac-12 Conference. The squad is led by first-year head coach Lindsay Gottlieb, who was hired on May 10, 2021. Prior to arriving at USC, Gottlieb served as an assistant coach for the Cleveland Cavaliers. Her previous head coaching experience includes stops at California, whom she led to the Final Four in 2013, and UC Santa Barbara.

Previous season
The 2020-21 USC Trojans women's basketball team finished with an overall record of 10-11 and a 8-10 conference record. They earned the 8th seed in the 2021 Pac-12 Conference women's basketball tournament. They topped Arizona State in the first round before falling in the quarterfinals to top-seeded Stanford, who won the tournament as well as the NCAA Championship.

After the season, head coach Mark Trakh announced his retirement. Members of his coaching staff found jobs elsewhere like Aarika Hughes who took the head coaching job at Loyola Marymount. Athletic Director Mike Bohn hired Gottlieb shortly after Trakh's retirement and commented that the Athletics Department would truly invest in the storied women's basketball program.

Offseason changes

Departures

Incoming transfer

2021 recruiting class
This season, the Women of Troy bring in the seventh-ranked recruiting class.

Roster

Schedule

|-
!colspan=9 style=| Non-conference regular season

|-
!colspan=9 style=| Pac-12 regular season

|-
!colspan=9 style=| Pac-12 Women's Tournament

Source:

Rankings

*The preseason and week 1 polls were the same.^Coaches did not release a week 2 poll.

Awards and honors
Akunwafo
McDonald's High School All-American
Jersey Mike's Naismith Trophy for High School Girls Player of the Year, 2021 Watch List
Jordan Brand Classic
Jackson
McDonald's High School All-American
Jordan Brand Classic
Marshall
McDonald's High School All-American
Jersey Mike's Naismith Trophy for High School Girls Player of the Year, 2021 Watch List
Jordan Brand Classic
Oliver
All Pac-12 Freshman Team Honorable Mention
Perkins
Virginia Gatorade Girls Basketball Player of the Year
Pili
All Pac-12 First Team
Pac-12 Freshman of the Year
3-time Alaska Gatorade Girls Basketball Player of the Year
2-time MaxPreps National Female Athlete of the Year
Katrina McClain Preseason Watchlist (2020, 2021)
Naismith Watch List (2020, 2021)
John R. Wooden Watch List
Reed
2-time All-Atlantic 10 First Team (VCU)
Sanders
All Pac-12 Honorable Mention
All-Big West First Team (UCI)
Big West Freshman of the Year (UCI)
Williams
2-time USA Today Wisconsin Player of the Year
Associated Press Wisconsin Player of the Year

Notes

References

External links
 USC Athletics Site
 USC Basketball Fan Forums

USC Trojans women's basketball seasons
USC
USC Trojans basketball, women
USC Trojans basketball, women
USC Trojans basketball, women
USC Trojans basketball, women